Alexander Hugh Bruce, 6th Lord Balfour of Burleigh,  (13 January 1849 – 6 July 1921) was a Scottish Unionist politician, banker and statesman, who took a leading part in the affairs of the Church of Scotland. He was Secretary for Scotland between 1895 and 1903.

Background
The son of Robert Bruce, at one time Tory Member of Parliament for Clackmannan, he was born in Kennet in that county and educated at Loretto, Eton and Oriel College, Oxford. In 1868, four years after his death, Robert Bruce's claim to the peerage was recognised by the House of Lords, and so his son became sixth Lord Balfour of Burleigh on the reversal of the title's attainder by Act of Parliament in 1869.

Political career

In 1876 Balfour was elected a Scottish representative peer. Six years later, he was made an Education Commissioner for Scotland, and in 1887 he entered Lord Salisbury's administration as a Lord-in-waiting. The following year, Lord Balfour became Parliamentary Secretary to the Board of Trade, a position he held until the Liberals returned to power in 1892, and for three years he chaired the London Water Supply Commission until his return to government as Secretary for Scotland in 1895. 
On 4 February 1903, Balfour opened the new purpose-built Leith Nautical College.

Balfour was appointed a Knight of the Thistle in 1901. Balfour resigned office  in 1903 with the split that occurred in the Conservative and Unionist Party over Joseph Chamberlain's campaign for tariff reform, a campaign which he opposed.

Banking career
Balfour was Governor of the Bank of Scotland from 1904 to 1921.

Other public appointments
Balfour was appointed Lord Rector of Edinburgh University (1896–1899), and elected Chancellor of St Andrews University in 1900, a post he held until his death. An active figure in the Church of Scotland, he was President of the World Missionary Conference held in Edinburgh in 1910, and was an important negotiator in the discussions on church union in Scotland which came to fruition in the 1920s. In 1916 he was appointed as chairman of the Committee on Commercial and Industrial Policy by Lloyd George and the economisers in the Cabinet in acknowledgement of his free trade credentials.  In 1917 he was appointed convener of the Carnegie Trust for the Universities of Scotland. He became Lord Warden of the Stannaries in Cornwall and a member of the Council of the Prince of Wales in 1908.

Honours
In June 1901 he received the honorary degree Doctor of Laws (LL.D) from the University of Glasgow, and later the same year he received the Freedom of the City of Glasgow ″for his services in facilitation legislation for the city″. The following May, he was at Carnavon to receive the honorary degree LL.D. (Legum Doctor) from the University of Wales during the ceremony to install the Prince of Wales (later King George V) as Chancellor of that university. In July 1902, he received the freedom of the city of St Andrews, ″in testimony of his great services to the Scottish nation in many capacities, and especially of the conspicuous abilities with which he had discharged the onerous duties of Secretary for Scotland, and the deep interest he had shown in the cause of education and in promoting the welfare of the country.″

He was appointed a Knight of the Thistle (KT) in March 1901, and invested by King Edward at Marlborough House on 18 March 1901.
He was appointed a GCMG in 1911, and GCVO in 1917.

History of Presbyterianism
Balfour wrote An Historical Account of the Rise and Development of Presbyterianism in Scotland, published in 1911 by the Cambridge University Press as part of their series Cambridge manuals of science and literature.

Family
Balfour married Lady Katherine Eliza, youngest daughter of the George Hamilton-Gordon, 5th Earl of Aberdeen, in 1876. They had two sons and three daughters. His eldest son, Robert Bruce, Master of Burleigh, was killed in the First World War. After his death the heir to the lordship transferred to his second son, George John Gordon Bruce, 7th Lord Balfour of Burleigh (1883–1967). His eldest daughter, Hon. Mary Bruce, OBE, married Sir John Augustus Hope, 16th Baronet Hope of Craighall.

Lord Burleigh of Balfour died at Cadogan Square, London, in July 1921, aged 72. He was buried in Clackmannan Churchyard. Lady Balfour of Burleigh died in February 1931, aged 78.

References

External links
 Find A Grave Memorial

1849 births
1921 deaths
Alumni of Oriel College, Oxford
Chancellors of the University of St Andrews
Conservative Party (UK) Baronesses- and Lords-in-Waiting
Knights Grand Cross of the Order of St Michael and St George
Knights Grand Cross of the Royal Victorian Order
Knights of the Thistle
Lords Balfour of Burleigh
Members of the Privy Council of the United Kingdom
Rectors of the University of Edinburgh
Scottish representative peers
Secretaries for Scotland
People educated at Loretto School, Musselburgh
Ordained peers
Unionist Party (Scotland) politicians
20th-century Scottish historians
Reformation historians
Governors of the Bank of Scotland
People from Clackmannanshire
Elders of the Church of Scotland
Parliamentary Secretaries to the Board of Trade
Alexander, 6th Lord Balfour